The CAVB qualification for the 2010 FIVB Volleyball Men's World Championship saw member nations compete for three places at the finals in Italy.

Draw
14 of the 53 CAVB national teams entered qualification. (DR Congo later withdrew) The teams were distributed according to their position in the FIVB Senior Men's Rankings as of 5 January 2008 using the serpentine system for their distribution. (Rankings shown in brackets) Teams ranked 1–6 did not compete in the second round, and automatically qualified for the third round.

Second round

Third round

Second round

Pool A
Venue:  Salle Omnisport Mohamed Nasri, Chlef, Algeria
Dates: 26–28 May 2009
All times are Central European Time (UTC+01:00)

|}

|}

Pool B
Venue:  Maxaquene, Maputo, Mozambique
Dates: 1–3 May 2009
All times are Central Africa Time (UTC+02:00)

|}

|}

Third round

Pool C
Venue:  Cairo Stadium Indoor Halls Complex, Cairo, Egypt
Dates: 18–20 August 2009
All times are Eastern European Summer Time (UTC+03:00)

|}

|}

Pool D
Venue:  El Menzah Sports Palace, Tunis, Tunisia
Dates: 14–16 August 2009
All times are Central European Time (UTC+01:00)

|}

|}

Pool E
Venue:  Palais des Sports de Warda, Yaoundé, Cameroon
Dates: 21–23 August 2009
All times are West Africa Time (UTC+01:00)

|}

|}

References

External links
 2010 World Championship Qualification

2010 FIVB Volleyball Men's World Championship
2009 in volleyball
FIVB Volleyball World Championship qualification